"If I Fall" is a song by Tara MacLean, from her album Passenger, first released in 1999.

Track listing
"If I Fall" [Radio Edit] — 4.00
"If I Fall" [Album Version] — 4.09

Soundtracks
"If I Fall" was featured on the soundtrack of the film Teaching Mrs. Tingle.

References

 
2000 singles
Tara MacLean songs